Brahmkumar Bhatt (1921-2009) was an Indian independence activist, Mahagujarat movement activist and socialist politician from Gujarat, India. He was elected as Member Of Legislative Assembly in Bombay State and Gujarat from Khadia constituent assembly. Later, he represented Gujarat as Member of parliament in Rajya Sabha during 1998–2004.

He also served as chairman of Gujarat Electricity Board and authored book named Le Ke Rahenge Mahagujarat which documentises the Mahagujarat movement. He was member of Praja Socialist Party in his early life. He died on 6 January 2009.

References 

Gujarati people
1921 births
2009 deaths
Politicians from Ahmedabad
Indian independence activists from Gujarat
Indian socialists
Bharatiya Lok Dal politicians
Praja Socialist Party politicians
Janata Party politicians
Indian National Congress politicians from Gujarat
Bombay State MLAs 1957–1960
Gujarat MLAs 1962–1967